is one of the preserved throwing techniques, Habukareta Waza, of Judo. It belonged to the fourth group, Yonkyo, of the 1895 Gokyo no Waza lists.  It is categorized as a foot technique, Ashi-waza.

Technique Description 
The tori wraps one arm across the chest of the uke and hooks his leg with tori's own leg to slam uke to the mat back-first. This technique is similar to Osoto Gari with the one difference being the uke's leg in this case does not leave the ground, i.e. the tori hooks the uke's leg, not sweep it.

Technique History 
Olympic judo silver-medalist Naoya Ogawa introduced this move to professional wrestling, where it can also be a lariat-legsweep combination to slam down opponent.

Included Systems 
Systems:
Kodokan Judo, List of Kodokan Judo techniques
Lists:
The Canon Of Judo
Judo technique

Similar Techniques, Variants, and Aliases 
Space Tornado Ogawa, the name the move is referred to in professional wrestling.

English aliases:
big outer drop

Similar techniques:
 o soto gari

Judo technique
Throw (grappling)